The 127th Maine Senate had 35 members each elected to two-year terms in November 2014. The first regular session was sworn-in on December 3, 2014.

The 127th Senate party composition will be:
 20 Republicans
 15 Democrats

Leadership

Senators

See also
 List of Maine State Senators

References

External links
 Maine Senate

Maine legislative sessions
2010s in Maine
2014 in Maine
2015 in Maine
2016 in Maine